Nikola Kočović (born 17 April 1996) is a Serbian professional basketball player for Borac Čačak of the Basketball League of Serbia and the ABA League.

Playing career 
During his career Kočović played for Mladost Čačak, Spartak, Metalac, Mladost Zemun, Vršac, Mladost Mrkonjić Grad, and Borac Čačak.

On 15 June 2021, Kočović signed a contract with Mega Basket. On 17 September 2022, Kočović signed for Borac Čačak.

References

External links 
 Player Profile at eurobasket.com
 Player Profile at realgm.com
 Player Profile at proballers.com
 Player Profile at aba-liga.com

1996 births
Living people
ABA League players
Basketball League of Serbia players
Basketball players from Čačak
KK Borac Čačak players
KK Mega Basket players
KK Metalac Valjevo players
KK Mladost Čačak players
KK Mladost Zemun players
KK Spartak Subotica players
KK Vršac players
Point guards
Serbian expatriate basketball people in Bosnia and Herzegovina
Serbian men's basketball players
Shooting guards